John Brown (September 1, 1904 – November 14, 1974) was an American college football player and film actor billed as John Mack Brown at the height of his screen career. He acted and starred mainly in Western films.

Early life

Born and raised in Dothan, Alabama, Brown was the son of Ed and Mattie Brown, one of eight siblings. His parents were shopkeepers. He was a star of the high school football team, earning a football scholarship to the University of Alabama. His little brother Tolbert "Red" Brown played with "Mack" in 1925.

After he finished college, he sold insurance and later coached the freshman running backs on the University of Alabama's football team.

University of Alabama
While at the University of Alabama, Brown became an initiated member of Kappa Sigma fraternity.

Football
Brown was a prominent halfback on his university's Crimson Tide football team, coached by Wallace Wade. He earned the nickname "The Dothan Antelope" and was inducted into the College Football Hall of Fame. Pop Warner called him "one of the fastest football players I've ever seen."

1924

The 1924 team lost only to Centre. Brown starred in the defeat of Georgia Tech.

1925
Brown helped the 1925 Alabama Crimson Tide football team to a national championship. In that year's Rose Bowl, he earned Most Valuable Player honors after scoring two of his team's three touchdowns in an upset win over the heavily favored Washington Huskies. The 1925 Crimson Tide was the first southern team to ever win a Rose Bowl. The game is commonly referred to as "the game that changed the south." Brown was selected All-Southern.

Film career

Starting at the top 
Brown's good looks and powerful physique saw him portrayed on Wheaties cereal boxes and in 1927, brought an offer for motion picture screen tests that resulted in a long and successful career in Hollywood. That same year, he signed a five-year contract with Metro–Goldwyn–Mayer. He played silent film star Mary Pickford's love interest in her first talkie, Coquette (1929), for which Pickford won an Oscar.

He appeared in minor roles until 1930 when he was cast as the star in a Western entitled Billy the Kid and directed by King Vidor. An early widescreen film (along with Raoul Walsh's The Big Trail starring John Wayne, produced the same year), the movie also stars Wallace Beery as Pat Garrett.  Brown was billed over Beery, who would become MGM's highest-paid actor within the next three years.  Also in 1930, Brown played Joan Crawford's love interest in Montana Moon. Brown went on to make several more top-flight movies under the name John Mack Brown, including The Secret Six (1931) with Wallace Beery, Jean Harlow, and Clark Gable, as well as the legendary Lost Generation celebration of alcohol, The Last Flight (1931), and was being groomed by MGM as a leading man until being abruptly replaced on Laughing Sinners in 1931, with all his scenes reshot, substituting rising star Clark Gable in his place. MGM and director Woody Van Dyke screen tested him for the lead role of Tarzan the Ape Man but Van Dyke didn't feel he was tall enough.

Steep decline 
Rechristened "Johnny Mack Brown" in the wake of this extremely serious career downturn, he made low-budget westerns for independent producers and he never regained his former status. Eventually he became one of the screen's top B-movie cowboys, and became a popular star at Universal Pictures in 1937. After starring in four serials, in 1939 he launched a series of 29 B-westerns over the next four years, all co-starring Fuzzy Knight as his comic sidekick, and the last seven teaming him with Tex Ritter. This is considered the peak of his B-western career, thanks to the studio's superior production values; noteworthy titles include Son of Roaring Dan, Raiders of San Joaquin and The Lone Star Trail, the latter featuring a young Robert Mitchum as the muscle heavy. A fan of Mexican music, Brown showcased the talents of guitarist Francisco Mayorga and The Guadalajara Trio in films like Boss of Bullion City and The Masked Rider.  Brown also starred in a 1933 Mascot Pictures serial Fighting with Kit Carson, and four serials for Universal (Rustlers of Red Dog, Wild West Days, Flaming Frontiers and The Oregon Trail).

Brown moved to Monogram Pictures in 1943 to replace that studio's cowboy star Buck Jones, who had died months before. Brown's Monogram series was immediately successful and he starred in more than 60 westerns over the next 10 years, including a 20-movie series playing "Nevada Jack McKenzie" opposite Buck Jones's (and earlier Wallace Beery's) old sidekick Raymond Hatton, beginning with the 1943 film The Ghost Rider. Brown was also featured in two higher-budgeted dramas, Forever Yours and Flame of the West, both released by Monogram in 1945 and both billing the actor under his former "A-picture" name, John Mack Brown.

When Monogram abandoned its brand name in 1952 (in favor of its deluxe division, Allied Artists), Johnny Mack Brown retired from the screen. He returned more than 10 years later to appear in secondary roles in a few Western films.  Altogether, Brown appeared in more than 160 movies between 1927 and 1966, as well as a smattering of television shows, in a career spanning almost 40 years.

Personal life
Brown was married to Cornelia "Connie" Foster from 1926 until his death in 1974, and they had four children.

Recognition
For his contributions to the film industry, Brown was inducted into the Hollywood Walk of Fame in 1960 with a motion pictures star at 6101 Hollywood Boulevard. He received a posthumous Golden Boot Award in 2004 for his contributions to the Western entertainment genre. In 1969, Brown was inducted into the Alabama Sports Hall of Fame.

Brown's hometown holds an annual Johnny Mack Brown Western Festival because “If anyone ever brought attention to Dothan, it was Johnny Mack Brown,” a city official said.

In popular culture
Brown is mentioned in the novel From Here to Eternity. In a barracks scene, soldiers discuss Western films, and one asks, "Remember Johnny Mack Brown?", resulting in a discussion.

From March 1950 to February 1959, Dell Comics published a Johnny Mack Brown series of comic books. He also was included in 21 issues of Dell's Giant Series Western Roundup comics that began in June 1952.

In 1974, The Statler Brothers, performing as the fictitious Lester "Roadhog" Moran and the Cadillac Cowboys, released Alive at the Johnny Mack Brown High School, a comedy album set at an equally fictitious school named after Brown.

Death
Brown died in Woodland Hills, California, of heart failure at the age of 70. His cremated remains are interred in an outdoor Columbarium, in Glendale's Forest Lawn Memorial Park Cemetery.

Selected filmography

 Slide, Kelly, Slide (1927) as Himself
 The Bugle Call (1927)  bit part (uncredited)
 Mockery (1927) as Russian Officer (uncredited)
 After Midnight (1927) as Party Boy (uncredited)
 The Fair Co-Ed (1927) as Bob
 The Divine Woman (1928) as Jean Lery
 Soft Living (1928) as Stockney Webb
 Square Crooks (1928) as Larry Scott
 The Play Girl (1928) as Bradley Lane
 Our Dancing Daughters (1928) as Ben Blaine
 Annapolis (1928) as Bill
 A Lady of Chance (1928) as Steve Crandall
 A Woman of Affairs (1928) as David Furness
 Coquette (1929) as Michael Jeffery
 The Valiant (1929) as Robert Ward
 The Single Standard (1929) as Tommy Hewlett
 Hurricane (1929) as Dan
 Jazz Heaven (1929) as Barry Holmes
 Undertow (1930) as Paul Whalen
 Montana Moon (1930) as Larry
 Billy the Kid (1930) as Billy the Kid
 Great Day (1930) (incomplete & unreleased)
 The Great Meadow (1931) as Berk Jarvis
 The Secret Six (1931) as Hank Rogers
 The Last Flight (1931) as Bill Talbot
 Lasca of the Rio Grande (1931) as Miles Kincaid
 Flames (1932) as Charlie
 The Vanishing Frontier (1932) as Kirby Tornell
 70,000 Witnesses (1932) as Wally Clark
 Malay Nights (1932) as Jim Wilson
 Fighting with Kit Carson (1933) as Kit Carson, SERIAL
 Saturday's Millions (1933) as Alan Barry
 Female (1933) as Cooper
 Son of a Sailor (1933) as 'Duke'
 Three on a Honeymoon (1934) as Chuck Wells
 St. Louis Woman (1934) as Jim Warren
 Marrying Widows  (1934)   as The Husband
 Cross Streets (1934) as Adam Blythe
 Belle of the Nineties (1934) as Brooks Claybourne
 Against the Law (1934) as Steve Wayne
 Rustlers of Red Dog (1935) as Jack Wood, SERIAL
 Branded a Coward (1935) as Johnny Hume
 Between Men (1935) as Johnny Wellington Jr.
 The Courageous Avenger (1935) as Kirk Baxter
 Valley of the Lawless (1936) as Bruce Reynolds
 Desert Phantom (1936) as Billy Donovan
 Rogue of the Range (1936) as Dan Doran
 Everyman's Law (1936) as Johnny – aka The Dog Town Kid
 The Crooked Trail (1936) as Jim Blake
 Undercover Man (1936) as Steve McLain
 Lawless Land (1936) as Ranger Jeff Hayden
 The Gambling Terror (1937) as Jeff Hayes
 Trail of Vengeance (1937) as Ken Early / Dude Ramsey
 Bar-Z Bad Men (1937) as Jim Waters
 Guns in the Dark (1937) as Johnny Darrel
 A Lawman Is Born (1937) as Tom Mitchell
 Wild West Days (1937) as Kentucky Wade, SERIAL
 Boothill Brigade (1937) as Lon Cardigan
 Born to the West (1937) as Tom Fillmore
 Wells Fargo (1937) as Talbot Carter
 Flaming Frontiers (1938) as Tex Houston, SERIAL
 The Oregon Trail (1939) as Jeff Scott, SERIAL
 Desperate Trails (1939) as Steve Hayden
 Oklahoma Frontier (1939) as Jeff McLeod
 Chip of the Flying U (1939) as 'Chip' Bennett
 West of Carson City (1940) as Jim Bannister
 Boss of Bullion City (1940) as Tom Bryant
 Riders of Pasco Basin (1940) as Lee Jamison
 Bad Man from Red Butte (1940) as Gils Brady / Buck Halliday
 Son of Roaring Dan (1940) as Jim Reardon
 Ragtime Cowboy Joe (1940) as Steve Logan
 Law and Order (1940) as Bill Ralston
 Pony Post (1940) as Cal Sheridan
 Bury Me Not on the Lone Prairie (1941) as Joe Henderson
 Law of the Range (1941) as Steve Howard
 Rawhide Rangers (1941) as Brand Calhoun
 Man from Montana (1941) as Sheriff Bob Dawson
 The Masked Rider (1941) as Larry Prescott
 Arizona Cyclone (1941) as Tom Baxter
 Fighting Bill Fargo (1941) as Bill Fargo
 Stagecoach Buckaroo (1942) as Steve Hardin
 Ride 'Em Cowboy (1942) as Alabam' Brewster
 The Silver Bullet (1942) as 'Silver Jim' Donovan
 Boss of Hangtown Mesa (1942) as Steve Collins
 Deep in the Heart of Texas (1942) as Jim Mallory
 Little Joe, the Wrangler (1942) as Neal Wallace
 The Old Chisholm Trail (1942) as Dusty Gardner
 Tenting Tonight on the Old Camp Ground (1943) as Wade Benson
 The Ghost Rider (1943) as Nevada Jack McKenzie
 Cheyenne Roundup (1943) as Buck Brandon & Gils Brandon
 Raiders of San Joaquin (1943) as 'Rocky' Morgan
 The Stranger from Pecos (1943) as Nevada Jack McKenzie
 Six Gun Gospel (1943) as Marshal Nevada Jack McKenzie
 The Lone Star Trail (1943) as Blaze Barker
 Crazy House (1943) as Himself
 Outlaws of Stampede Pass (1943) as Marshal Nevada Jack McKenzie
 The Texas Kid (1943) as Nevada Jack McKenzie
 Raiders of the Border (1944) as Nevada Jack McKenzie
 Partners of the Trail (1944) as U.S. Marshal Nevada Jack McKenzie
 Law Men (1944) as U.S. Marshal Nevada Jack McKenzie
 Range Law (1944) as U.S. Marshal Nevada McKenzie
 West of the Rio Grande (1944) as U.S. Marshal 'Nevada Jack' McKenzie
 Land of the Outlaws (1944) as Marshal Nevada Jack McKenzie
 Law of the Valley (1944) as Marshal Nevada McKenzie
 Ghost Guns (1944) as Marshal Nevada Jack McKenzie
 The Navajo Trail (1945) as Marshal Nevada – aka Rocky Saunders
 Forever Yours (1945) as Maj. Tex O'Connor
 Gun Smoke (1945) as Marshal Nevada Jack McKenzie
 Stranger from Santa Fe (1945) as U.S. Marshal Nevada McKenzie, posing as Roy Ferris
 Flame of the West (1945) as Dr. John Poole
 The Lost Trail (1945) as Marshal Nevada Jack McKenzie
 Frontier Feud (1945) as Marshal Nevada Jack McKenzie
 Border Bandits (1946) as Marshal Nevada 
 Drifting Along  (1946) as Steve Garner
 The Haunted Mine (1946) as Marshal Nevada Jack McKenzie
 Under Arizona Skies (1946) as Dusty Smith
 The Gentleman from Texas (1946) as Johnny Macklin
 Trigger Fingers (1946) as Sam 'Hurricane' Benton
 Shadows on the Range (1946) as Steve Mason – Posing as Steve Saunders
 Silver Range (1946) as Johnny Bronton
 Raiders of the South (1947) as Captain Johnny Brownell
 Valley of Fear (1947) as Johnny Williams
 Trailing Danger (1947) as Johnny
 Land of the Lawless (1947) as Johnny Mack
 The Law Comes to Gunsight (1947) as Johnny Macklin
 Code of the Saddle (1947) as John Macklin
 Flashing Guns (1947) as Johnny Mack
 Prairie Express (1947) as Johnny Hudson
 Gun Talk (1947) as Johnny McVey
 Overland Trails (1948) as Johnny Murdock
 Crossed Trails (1948) as Johnny Mack
 Frontier Agent (1948) as Himself
 Triggerman (1948) as Himself
 Back Trail (1948) as Johnny Mack
 The Fighting Ranger (1948) as Ranger Johnny Brown
 The Sheriff of Medicine Bow (1948) as Sheriff Johnny
 Gunning for Justice (1948) as Johnny Mack
 Hidden Danger (1948) as Johnny Mack
 Law of the West (1949) as Federal Agent Johnny Mack
 Trails End (1949) as Johnny Mack
 Stampede (1949) as Sheriff Aaron Ball
 West of El Dorado (1949) as Johnny Mack
 Law of the West (1949) as Johnny Mack
 Range Justice (1949) as Himself
 Western Renegades (1949) as Himself
 West of Wyoming (1950) as Himself
 Over the Border (1950) as Himself
 Six Gun Mesa (1950) as Himself
 Law of the Panhandle (1950) as Himself
 Outlaw Gold (1950) as Himself
 Short Grass (1950) as Sheriff Ord Keown
 Colorado Ambush (1951) as Himself
 Man from Sonora (1951) as Himself
 Blazing Bullets (1951) as Marshal
 Montana Desperado (1951) as Himself
 Oklahoma Justice (1951) as Himself
 Whistling Hills (1951) as Himself
 Texas Lawmen (1951) as Marshall
 Texas City (1952) as Himself
 Man from the Black Hills (1952) as Himself
 Dead Man's Trail (1952) as Himself
 Canyon Ambush (1952) as Himself
 The Marshal's Daughter (1953) as Poker-Game Player #2
 Requiem for a Gunfighter (1965) as Enkoff
 The Bounty Killer (1965) as Sheriff Green
 Apache Uprising (1965) as Sheriff Ben Hall (final film role)

References

External links

 
 
 

1904 births
1974 deaths
20th-century American male actors
Alabama Crimson Tide football players
American male film actors
American male silent film actors
Male film serial actors
Male Western (genre) film actors
All-Southern college football players
Sportspeople from Dothan, Alabama
Players of American football from Alabama
Male actors from Alabama
Burials at Forest Lawn Memorial Park (Glendale)